Cryptolinyphia is a monotypic genus of South American dwarf spiders containing the single species, Cryptolinyphia sola. It was first described by Alfred Frank Millidge in 1991, and has only been found in Colombia.

See also
 List of Linyphiidae species

References

Linyphiidae
Monotypic Araneomorphae genera
Spiders of South America